Vampire Blvd. is a 2004 vampire film directed by and starring Scott Shaw. This co-stars of this film include Kevin Thompson, Joe Estevez Robert Z'Dar, Adrienne Lau and Jill Kelly.

Plot
"This film is set in 1970s Hollywood, California. This film follows two primary characters, Elijah Starr and Blaze Jones, played by Shaw and Thompson. These two characters are Hollywood Private investigators who attempt to help a newly arrived actress from Hong Kong who is being tracked down by a cult of Vampires."

"Vampire Blvd. is like pore without sex scenes, skit without comedy, action-horror with neither." "A mad scientist has created bondage-clad vampires, an Asian babe thinks she being stalked by vampires, a black and white face painted ninja gal writhes in a fast food restaurant, wiggled skate freaks zoom through a canal, Joe Estevez sings and lights a candle, a robot Robert Z'Dar beats his female robot equivalent, Shaw fights invisible bat things in an effect sequence that might have been created with a dot matrix printer, and porn star Jilly Kelly wriggles on a toilet."

Hollywood
Similar to many Scott Shaw films Vampire Blvd. utilities Hollywood, California as a cinematic backdrop.

Zen Filmmaking
This film is considered a Zen Film in that it was created in the distinct style of filmmaking formulated by Scott Shaw known as Zen Filmmaking.  In this style of filmmaking no scripts are used.

References

External links
 Vampire Blvd. Official Website

2004 films
2004 horror films
2000s English-language films
Films directed by Scott Shaw